The North Devon Show is an annual agricultural show in Devon, England, organised by the North Devon Agricultural Society (established 1966, registered charity 1071618). It is currently held at Umberleigh Barton Farm at Umberleigh in 2012. The show includes animal and vehicle exhibitions, displays of local produce, agricultural trade stands and a fairground, among other attractions.

The first North Devon Show was held in 1966, formed from an amalgamation of shows held in Great Torrington and Instow. In 2016, it  attracted an estimated 20,000 visitors and is the biggest event in the local area. The 2016 show was held at a cost of almost £300,000.

There was only one show casualty: in 2020 when officials cited the COVID-19 pandemic as grounds for cancellation.

References

External links 

 http://www.basc.org.uk/en/in-your-area/south-west/south-west-diary.cfm/eid/D1FA4B27-FFE0-4A7F-829CED265D4610CA

Events in Devon
Agricultural shows in England